Ego Trip is the fourth studio album by Bosnian alternative rock band Sikter. It was released on 2 June 2009 by one of the biggest music labels in Bosnia and Herzegovina, Hayat Production.

Recording of the album began in 2006 and lasted until 2009 at MML Studio in Sarajevo. Producers of album were front-man of the band Enes Zlatar and the drummer of Bosnian band Letu Štuke, Đani Pervan. After a few years of experimenting with many genres, this album was alternative rock oriented with elements of funk and soul.

Track listing

Personnel
Sikter
Enes Zlatar, vocals, keyboards, programming, producer
Esad Bratović – guitars
Dejan Rokvić – bass, vocals
Igor Čamo – keyboards
Nedim Zlatar – drums, keyboards, programming
Leonardo Šarić – backing vocals, keyboards, programming
Dejan Kajević – backing vocals

Production
Đani Pervan – producer, mastering

References

External links
Ego Trip on Hayat Production
Review o Bosnian language

2009 albums
Sikter albums
Hayat Production albums